The 1935–36 Montreal Maroons season involved participating in the longest playoff game in NHL history.

Regular season

Final standings

Record vs. opponents

Playoffs

Schedule and results

Player stats

Regular season
Scoring

Goaltending

Playoffs
Scoring

Goaltending

Note: GP = Games played; G = Goals; A = Assists; Pts = Points; +/- = Plus/minus; PIM = Penalty minutes; PPG = Power-play goals; SHG = Short-handed goals; GWG = Game-winning goals
      MIN = Minutes played; W = Wins; L = Losses; T = Ties; GA = Goals against; GAA = Goals against average; SO = Shutouts;

Playoffs
In one of the most evenly matched series, the first game of the Maroons-Red Wings series set a record for the longest game in Stanley Cup playoff history. The game began at 8:30 p.m. at the Forum in Montreal, and ended at 2:25 a.m. The game was scoreless until in the sixth overtime, when Mud Bruneteau scored on Maroon goaltender Lorne Chabot to win the game. Normie Smith shut out the Maroons in the next game, and the Red Wings then beat the Maroons to win the series.

References

External links
Maroons on Hockey Database

Montreal Maroons seasons
Montreal Maroons
Montreal Maroons